John Medley Flewelling (June 28, 1879 – October 31, 1925) was a Canadian politician. He served in the Legislative Assembly of New Brunswick as member of the Conservative party representing Charlotte County from 1921 to 1925 and St. Stephen-Milltown from 1925 until his death later that year.

References

20th-century Canadian politicians
1879 births
1926 deaths
Progressive Conservative Party of New Brunswick MLAs